Velone-Orneto  is a commune in the Haute-Corse department of France on the island of Corsica.

Geography
The municipality of Velone-Orneto is located about forty miles south of Bastia, and is part of the Tavagna (Haute-Corse), with four other municipalities: Taglio-Isolaccio, Pero-Casevecchie, Talasani and Poggio-Mezzana. Six hamlets composing the municipality: Orneto, Carbonaccia, Velone, Inelaccia, Fiuminale Suttanu and Fiuminale Supranu (the latter three have been abandoned).

Population

See also
Communes of the Haute-Corse department

References

Communes of Haute-Corse